The women's 200 metre breaststroke event, included in the swimming competition at the 1964 Summer Olympics, took place on 11–12 October, at the Yoyogi National Gymnasium. In this event, swimmers covered four lengths of the 50-metre (160 ft) Olympic-sized pool employing the breaststroke. It was the ninth appearance of the event, which first appeared at the 1924 Summer Olympics in Paris. A total of 27 competitors from 15 nations participated in the event. Soviet Union's Galina Prozumenshchikova and Svetlana Babanina won their country's first ever medals in this event, with a gold and bronze medal respectively. Claudia Kolb's silver medal was the United States' second ever medal in this event, after Agnes Geraghty's silver in the inaugural event in 1924. In the heats, Australian Christine Barnetson was disqualified for an incorrect breaststroke, and Hungarian Márta Egerváry withdrew from the competition.

Records
Prior to this competition, the existing world and Olympic records were:

The following records were established during the competition:

Results

Heats

Final

References

Women's breaststroke 200 metre
1964 in women's swimming
Women's events at the 1964 Summer Olympics